Mohammed Abubakari (born 15 February 1986) is a Ghanaian footballer who plays as a midfielder for Finnish club Mariehamn.

Career
Abubakari previously played for Fetteh Football Academy in Ghana and for Dutch side Feyenoord. Abubakari became the first player who moved from Ghanaian farmer team Feyenoord Academy to the Dutch side Feyenoord on 17 February 2006. After just eighteen months he left Feyenoord for Greece and promoted club Panserraikos FC signed him on a two-year deal until 30 June 2009. On 4 May 2009, he agreed to join PAOK F.C. on a free transfer signing a 4-year contract. He was on loan to Panserraikos F.C. until December 2010.

In 2012, he moved to the Swedish Allsvenskan club Åtvidabergs FF. After three seasons he left lower-side Åtvidabergs FF. Abubakari moved to Allsvenskan team BK Häcken in January 2015 as a free agent.
 Ahead of the 2018 season, Abubakari signed a three year-deal (with an option for a further) with Helsingborgs IF in Superettan.

On 17 February 2022, Abubakari renewed his contract with Mariehamn for the 2022 season.

References

External links
 Stats & Profile on futbol.pl

1986 births
Living people
Ghanaian footballers
Feyenoord players
Panserraikos F.C. players
PAOK FC players
Athlitiki Enosi Larissa F.C. players
Doxa Drama F.C. players
Ghanaian expatriate footballers
Expatriate footballers in the Netherlands
Ghanaian expatriate sportspeople in the Netherlands
Expatriate footballers in Greece
Ghanaian expatriate sportspeople in Greece
Footballers from Kumasi
West African Football Academy players
Åtvidabergs FF players
BK Häcken players
Helsingborgs IF players
Allsvenskan players
Superettan players
Expatriate footballers in Sweden
Ghanaian expatriate sportspeople in Sweden
IFK Mariehamn players
Veikkausliiga players
Expatriate footballers in Finland
Ghanaian expatriate sportspeople in Finland
Association football midfielders